"That's the Truth" is a song written by Paul Kennerley and originally recorded by Johnny Cash for his 1983 album Johnny 99.

Released in 1984 as a single (Columbia 38-04428, with "Joshua Gone Barbados" on the B-side) from that album, the song reached number 84 on U.S. Billboard country chart for the week of May 19.

Track listing

Charts

References

External links 
 "That's the Truth" on the Johnny Cash official website

Johnny Cash songs
1983 songs
1984 singles
Songs written by Paul Kennerley
Song recordings produced by Brian Ahern (producer)
Columbia Records singles